The Mahamastakabhisheka ("Grand Consecration", "The Great Indian Festival") refers to the abhiṣeka (anointment) of the Jain images when held on a large scale. The most famous of such consecrations is the anointment of the Bahubali Gommateshwara statue located at Shravanabelagola in Karnataka, India. It is an important Jain festival held once every 12 years. It is an integral part of the ancient and composite Jain tradition.

The anointing last took place in February 2018, and the next ceremony will take place in 2030. The ceremony in 2018 is said to be the 88th in the series that commenced in the year 981 AD and was the second Mahamastakabhisheka of the 21st century. The ceremony is expected to be graced by numerous Jain ascetics. The February 2018 event was held under the leadership of Charukeerthi Bhattaraka Swamiji of Shravanabelagola from 17 to 25 February 2018.

Anointment of the Gommateshwara Bahubali image 
Bhagwan Bahubali, the son of Bhagwan Rishabhanatha, the first of the twenty four Jain Tirthankaras, is worshiped for living with exceptional qualities that he displayed during all stages of his life from conception, birth, renunciation, enlightenment and salvation. This 58.8 feet tall statue is the most magnificent among all Jain works of art. It was built in circa 983. The Bahubali statue is described as one of the mightiest achievements of ancient Karnataka in the realm of sculptural art. The statue stands upright in the posture of meditation known as kayotsarga, reaching a height of nearly 57 feet atop the Vindhyagiri Hills - accessible through a flight of 700 steps.

Procedure
Purified water and sandalwood paste is poured over the statue from a scaffolding. This event continues for weeks. As the Mahamastakabhisheka begins, consecrated water is sprinkled onto the participants by devotees carrying 1,008 specially prepared vessels (kalashes). The statue is then bathed and anointed with libations such as milk, sugarcane juice, and saffron paste, and sprinkled with powders of sandalwood, turmeric, and vermilion. Offerings are made of petals, gold and silver coins, and precious stones. Most recently, the ceremony's finale has included an enormous shower of flowers from a waiting helicopter.

Other Mahamastakabhishekas
Apart from the anointment of the Gommateshwara statue at Shravana Belgola, anointment of the Jaina images take place at Jain temples throughout India. Anointment of the other Gommateshwara statues in Karnataka are also honoured with a Mahamastakabhisheka festival every 12 years.

 Dharmasthala Mahamastakabhisheka
 Karkala Mahamastakabhisheka - The last Mahamastakabhisheka was held in February 2002, and the next will be in 2015.
 Venur Mahamastakabhisheka - The last one was from 28 January 2012 to 5 February 2012. The next one will be in 2024.
Kumbhoj Mahamastakabhisheka - The last Mahamastakabhisheka was held in 2015, and the next will be in 2027.

See also
Jain rituals and festivals
Panch Kalyanaka
Jainism in Karnataka

References

Citations

Sources

External links

 Mahamasthakabhisheka Bahubali Official Website
 BBC News Special: Interview and Photo Reportage

Jain festivals
Festivals in Karnataka